Rod William Streater (born February 9, 1988) is a former American football wide receiver. He played college football at Temple University. He signed with the Oakland Raiders as an undrafted free agent in 2012 and has also had stints with the Kansas City Chiefs, San Francisco 49ers, Buffalo Bills, and Cleveland Browns.

Streater became a scout for the Cleveland Browns in 2019.

Early years
Streater grew up in Burlington Township, New Jersey where he played high school football for the Falcons at Burlington Township High School.

College career
Streater played junior college football at Alfred State College (before the technical school transitioned to the NCAA level), then transferred to Temple University. In his first season at Temple, Streater caught 30 receptions for 481 yards and four touchdowns. In his senior season, playing in an almost exclusively run-based offense, Streater had 19 receptions for 401 receiving yards and four receiving touchdowns. Temple won its first bowl game since 1979 during Streater's senior campaign.

Professional career

Oakland Raiders
After being undrafted in the 2012 NFL Draft, Streater then signed with the Oakland Raiders as an undrafted free agent. Streater was in the starting lineup for the Raiders on Monday Night Football against the San Diego Chargers to open the 2012 NFL season. He made his first NFL reception in the first quarter, a catch of a Carson Palmer pass, and fumbled at the end of the play. Despite the way he entered the league, Streater wound up finishing fourth on the team with 584 receiving yards on 39 receptions and three touchdowns.

In 2013, Streater had an excellent second season, with 60 catches, 888 receiving yards, and four receiving touchdowns. He had a career-long 66 yard catch against the Philadelphia Eagles in Week 8.

In the 2014 season, Streater only played in the first three games due to a foot injury. He recorded nine receptions for 84 receiving yards and one receiving touchdown on the year.

In the 2015 season, he only appeared in one game and had one eight-yard reception.

Kansas City Chiefs
On March 12, 2016, Streater signed a one-year, $4.8 million contract with the Kansas City Chiefs.

San Francisco 49ers
On September 3, 2016, Streater and a conditional seventh-round draft pick were traded to the 49ers for a conditional seventh-round draft pick. He played in all 16 games with two starts, recording 18 receptions for 191 yards and two touchdowns.

Buffalo Bills
On May 24, 2017, Streater signed with the Buffalo Bills. He was released on September 2, 2017. He signed a reserve/future contract with the Bills on January 1, 2018.

On September 1, 2018, Streater was released by the Bills.

Cleveland Browns
Streater was signed by the Cleveland Browns on September 17, 2018. Streater was placed on injured reserve on October 16, 2018 after sustaining a season-ending neck injury during a game in Week 6.

Executive career

Cleveland Browns
Streater remained with the Browns after his departure from the active roster. In 2019, he completed an internship with the team and joined the scouting department in 2020 as an assistant.

Philadelphia Eagles
On June 3, 2022, the Philadelphia Eagles hired Streater as a northeast area scout.

Personal life 
Streater is an avid chess player, having learned it from his father and uncle when he was five years old. He frequently played against teammate Amari Cooper. He was invited to Chess.com's BlitzChamps tournament, a rapid tournament for NFL players.

References

External links
Cleveland Browns bio
Oakland Raiders bio 
Temple Owls bio

1988 births
Living people
American football wide receivers
Alfred State College alumni
Buffalo Bills players
Cleveland Browns executives
Cleveland Browns players
Kansas City Chiefs players
Oakland Raiders players
People from Burlington, New Jersey
People from Burlington Township, New Jersey
Players of American football from New Jersey
San Francisco 49ers players
Sportspeople from Burlington County, New Jersey
Temple Owls football players
Ed Block Courage Award recipients